MRT 2 Sat  is a television channel in North Macedonia owned and operated by Macedonian Radio Television.

See also
 Television in North Macedonia

References

External links
 

Macedonian Radio Television
Television channels in North Macedonia